In molecular biology, snoRNA HBII-289 belongs to the family of C/D snoRNAs.
It is the human orthologue of the mouse MBII-289 and has no identified RNA target.

References

External links 
 

Small nuclear RNA